The Dene people are an indigenous group of First Nations who inhabit the northern boreal and Arctic regions of Canada. The Dene speak Northern Athabaskan languages.  Dene is the common Athabaskan word for "people".  The term "Dene" has two usages.  More commonly, it is used narrowly to refer to the Athabaskan speakers of the Northwest Territories and Nunavut in Canada, especially including the Chipewyan (Denesuline), Tlicho (Dogrib), Yellowknives (T'atsaot'ine), Slavey (Deh Gah Got'ine or Deh Cho), and Sahtu (the Eastern group in Jeff Leer's classification; part of the Northwestern Canada group in Keren Rice's classification). However, it is sometimes also used to refer to all Northern Athabaskan speakers, who are spread in a wide range all across Alaska and northern Canada. The Southern Athabaskan speakers, however, also refer to themselves by similar words: Diné (Navajo) and Indé (Apache).

Location 
Dene are spread through a wide region.  They live in the Mackenzie Valley (south of the Inuvialuit), and can be found west of Nunavut.  Their homeland reaches to western Yukon, and the northern part of British Columbia, Alberta, Saskatchewan, Manitoba, Alaska and the southwestern United States.
Dene were the first people to settle in what is now the Northwest Territories. In northern Canada, historically there were ethnic feuds between the Dene and the Inuit. In 1996, Dene and Inuit representatives participated in a healing ceremony to reconcile the centuries-old grievances.

Behchoko, Northwest Territories is the largest Dene community in Canada.

Ethnography 
The Dene include five main groups:
Chipewyan (Denesuline), living east of Great Slave Lake, and including the Sayisi Dene living at Tadoule Lake, Manitoba
Tlicho (Dogrib), living between Great Slave and Great Bear Lakes
Yellowknives (T'atsaot'ine), living north of Great Slave Lake
Slavey (Deh Gah Got'ine or Deh Cho), the North Slavey (Sahtu, (Sahtúot’ine), including the Locheux, Nahanni, and Bear Lake peoples) living along the Mackenzie River (Deh Cho) near Great Bear Lake, the South Slavey southwest of Great Slave Lake and into Alberta and British Columbia.
Sahtu (Sahtúot’ine), including the Locheux, Nahanni, and Bear Lake peoples, in the central NWT.

Although the above-named groups are what the term "Dene" usually refers to in modern usage, other groups who consider themselves Dene include:
 Tsuu T'ina, aka the Sarcee, currently located near Calgary, Alberta.
 The Beaver people (Danezaa or Dunneza) of northeastern British Columbia and neighbouring regions of northwestern Alberta.
 The Tahltan, Kaska, and Sekani people of the Northern Interior of British Columbia. Another group in this region, the Tsetsaut people, lived in the Portland Canal area of the northernmost BC Coast near the border with Alaska. They are now extinct.
 The Dakelh (Carrier) peoples of the Northern and Central Interior of British Columbia, and their subgroup the Wet'suwet'en
 The Tsilhqot'in people of the eponymous Chilcotin District of the Central Interior of British Columbia
 The extinct Nicola Athapaskans, aka the Stuwix ("strangers" in the Shuswap language), migrated south from northern BC into the Nicola Valley region in the late 18th century and were absorbed into the Nicola people, an alliance of Nlaka'pamux and Okanagan peoples.
 The Gwich'in and Tanana and other peoples of Yukon and Alaska are also considered to be Dene, which is to say part of the family of Athapaskan-speaking peoples.

In 2005, elders from the Dene People decided to join the Unrepresented Nations and Peoples Organisation (UNPO) seeking recognition for their ancestral cultural and land rights.

The largest population of Denesuline speakers live in the northern Saskatchewan village of La Loche
and the adjoining Clearwater River Dene Nation. In 2011 the combined population was 3389 people. The Denesuline language is spoken by 89% of the residents.

Notable Dene 
 Thanadelthur (c. 1697 – 5 February 1717) a woman of the Chipewyan Nation, a guide and interpreter, who was instrumental in forging a peace agreement between the Chipewyan and the Cree people
 Ethel Blondin-Andrew, former MP for Western Arctic (Northwest Territories)
 Leela Gilday, Canadian folk singer, Juno winner 
 Jimmy Herman (1940-2013) actor, Dances with Wolves
 Matonabbee (c. 1737–1782), guide for Samuel Hearne's expedition to the Coppermine River
 Tahmoh Penikett, actor, Battlestar Galactica and Dollhouse
 Eric Schweig, actor, The Last of the Mohicans
 Jim Boucher, politician, businessman
 Shannon Smallwood, justice of the Supreme Court of the Northwest Territories
 Be'sha Blondin, elder and founder of the Arctic Indigenous Wellness Foundation

See also 
Athabaskan languages
Alaskan Athabaskans (Alaskan Dene, Tinneh), Athabaskan peoples of the interior of Alaska
Navajo Nation (Diné), southern Athabaskan people
Apache people (Inde), southern Athabaskan people
Hupa, California Athabaskan people
Cahto people, California Athabaskan people
Mattole people, California Athabaskan people
Wailaki, California Athabaskan people
Galice language-speakers (Oregon Athabaskan): Chetco, Tolowa, Coquille, Tututni

References

Further reading 

 Abel, Kerry M. Drum Songs: Glimpses of Dene History. McGill-Queen's studies in ethnic history, 15. Montreal: Buffalo, 1993. 
 Bielawski, E. Rogue Diamonds: Northern Riches on Dene Land. Seattle: University of Washington Press, 2004. 
 Holland, Lynda, Celina Janvier, and Larry Hewitt. The Dene Elders Project: Stories and History from the Westside. La Ronge, Sask: Holland-Dalby Educational Consulting, 2002. 
 Marie, Suzan, and Judy Thompson. Dene Spruce Root Basketry: Revival of a Tradition. Mercury series. Hull, Quebec: Canadian Museum of Civilization, 2002. 
 Marie, Suzan, and Judy Thompson. Whadoo Tehmi Long-Ago People's Packsack: Dene Babiche Bags : Tradition and Revival. Mercury series. Gatineau, Québec: Canadian Museum of Civilization, 2004. 
 Moore, Patrick, and Angela Wheelock. Wolverine Myths and Visions: Dene Traditions from Northern Alberta. Studies in the anthropology of North American Indians. Lincoln: University of Nebraska Press, 1990. 
 Ryan, Joan. Doing Things the Right Way: Dene Traditional Justice in Lac La Martre, N.W.T.. Calgary: University of Calgary Press, 1995. 
 Sharp, Henry S. Loon: Memory, Meaning, and Reality in a Northern Dene Community. Lincoln: University of Nebraska Press, 2001. 
 Watkins, Mel. Dene Nation, the Colony Within. Toronto: University of Toronto Press, 1977. 
 Wake, Val. White Bird Black Bird, Charleston, South Carolina, Booksurge, 2008

External links 

 Dene Nation
 People of the Deh Cho
 Dene Crafts: Explore photographs, a comprehensive bibliography, and a brief history of Dene Crafts.
 Voyages from Montreal Through the Continent of North America to the Frozen and Pacific Oceans in 1789 and 1793 Vol. I (1902 ed.)
 Voyages from Montreal Through the Continent of North America to the Frozen and Pacific Oceans in 1789 and 1793 Vol. II (1903 ed.)
1970s The Rise of Aboriginal Political Organizations NWT Historical Timeline, Prince of Wales Northern Heritage Centre

 
Indigenous peoples of the Subarctic
Members of the Unrepresented Nations and Peoples Organization